Robert Liston (22 March 1730 – 11 February 1796) was a Scottish minister who served as Moderator of the General Assembly of the Church of Scotland in 1787/88.

Life
Robert Liston, was born 22 March 1730, the son of John Liston (1687-1764), minister of Aberdour. The Liston family had been much involved in the Covenanter struggles. His great grandfather William had been sentenced to death for his part in the Battle of Rullion Green, though he fled and escaped. Robert began to attend school on 11 February 1735 and, when he was thirteen, he matriculated as a student at the University of Edinburgh on 13 October 1743. The age of 13/14 was the standard age to attend university at that time.

He was licensed to preach as a minister of the Church of Scotland by the Presbytery of Dunfermline on 5 September 1753. Some members of the Presbytery had opposed his father's original appointment as Minister, fighting it all the way up to the General Assembly. They felt he was being imposed on them by then Patron, Robert, Earl of Morton, and the rich Heritors of the Parish. Such disputes were common throughout Scotland at the time. One of those who had added his voice against John Lister's appointment, Ebenezer Erskine was to lead a number of Ministers out of the Church of Scotland as a protest against Patronage, forming the Original Secession Church.

Perhaps to avoid such disputes, several heritors and Elders of the Kirk Session of Aberdour in Fife wrote to James Douglas, 14th Earl of Morton, who now Patron of the Parish, shortly after Robert had been licensed, and asked that he be appointed assistant and expected successor to his father. This was agreed and he was called on 13 December and ordained on 2 April 1754 as assistant minister of Aberdour, under his father. Ten years later, on 17 September 1764, when his father died, he became the Minister of Aberdour.

As Minister of Aberdour, Robert Liston wrote the Report for that Parish for John Sinclair's First Statistical Account of Scotland in 1792.

Moderator of the General Assembly
He was unanimously elected Moderator of the General Assembly of the Church of Scotland on 17 May 1787., the last person to be elected to that post who was not a Doctor of Divinity. This was a fairly routine meeting of the General Assembly. The King's Lord High Commissioner to the General Assembly of the Church of Scotland, David Melville, 6th Earl of Leven read the King's letter, assuring those assembled of his respect and admiration, advised them to avoid unnecessary disputations and to do all they can to encourage virtue and obedience to the law. The King also sent them £1000 to promote the Protestant religion (and loyalty to the throne) in the Highlands and Islands. A Committee of the Assembly drew up a reply, pledging their loyalty and devotion and promising to encourage their members to appreciate that they live in the freest country in the world with the most benign of monarchs. They thanked him for his £1000 and promised to put it to good use, especially in the more barbarous parts of the country (South Uist, Argyle and Glenelg) which were blighted with Popery and superstition.

It was brought to their notice that a Patron had advertised the sale of his Patronage over a Parish. This outraged the Assembly, who set up a committee to clarify the rules to avoid Simony. Other routine activity dealt with the training of divinity students and proper attendance at the General Assembly. Otherwise, it acted as a final court of appeal on a number of cases. The Patron of the Parish of Kilbarchan had died and his trustees had presented a Mr Maxwell, who was tutor to the family, to the Presbytery as the new Minister. The Presbytery of Paisley had objected that the Patronage had been willed to his son-in-law, who had not presented anyone, so the right had descended to them. The Assembly ordered the Presbytery to admit Mr Maxwell immediately as Minister of Kilbarchan. In another case, after much deliberation, it dismissed the appeal of Mr James Mcintosh, Minister of Moy and Dalarossie, and formally deposed him, for the offence of fornication, from the office of the holy ministry "for all time coming". It also dismissed the appeal of Thomas Rattray, Esquire, of Dalrulzian, against the Presbytery of Dunkeld, claiming he was not, as libelled, the father of the children of Isabel Downie.

The Assembly received petition from the Scots Church in Shelburne, Nova Scotia, asking for some help to build a church. The Assembly agreed to send them a message of support, but could not send any money in the current circumstances.

Family
Liston married Janet Hardie (1744-1814), daughter of Henry Hardy, Minister of Culross on 11 November 1766.  His children became, or married, ministers, lawyers, army officers and merchants. Two of his children Henry and William, followed him into the Ministry. Henry declined the offer of the Kirk Session to be appointed his father's successor, feeling dynasties were not the proper thing for the Church of Scotland. He became Minister of Ecclesmachan, and also became an inventor. He was the father of surgeon Robert Liston. William was a keen botanist (he had studied Medicine at University). 

Liston died on 11 February 1796. He was succeeded in his role as minister of Aberdour by Rev William Bryce DD (1770-1841). Liston's wife Janet died at Auldcathie, Hoptoun Park, on 31 December 1814.

In 1792 his daughter, Anne Liston (1768-1852), married Hugh Meiklejohn who went on to be Moderator of the General Assembly of the Church of Scotland in 1810.

Publication
 Report for the Parish of Aberdour in Sir John Sinclair's Statistical Account of Scotland Vol IV, Number XLV, page 327 Edinburgh 1792

Sources
 The Scots Magazine Vol XLIX Sands, Brymer, Murray and Cochran, Edinburgh, 1787
 Struthers, John The history of Scotland, from the union to the abolition of the heritable jurisdictions in MDCCXLVIII Vol II, Blackie, Fullarton, & Co., Glasgow, 1828
 Woodrow, Robert & Burns, Robert The History of the Sufferings of the Church of Scotland, from the Restoration to the Revolution, Volume II, Blackie, Fullarton, & Co., Glasgow, 1829
 Acts of the General Assembly of the Church of Scotland 1787 Church Law Society, Edinburgh 1849 (British History Online)
 Ross, William Aberdour and Inchcolme; being historical notices of the parish and monastery, in twelve lectures David Douglas, Edinburgh, 1885
 McCall, Hardy Bertram Some Old Families: A Contribution to the Genealogical History of Scotland Birmingham, 1890 (Facsimile 2000 by Heritage Books, Bowie, Maryland, USA)
 Scott, Hew Fasti ecclesiae scoticanae; the succession of ministers in the Church of Scotland from the reformation New Edition Vol V Synods of Fife and of Angus and Mearns, Oliver and Boyd, Edinburgh 1925

Notes

See also
 List of Moderators of the General Assembly of the Church of Scotland

Moderators of the General Assembly of the Church of Scotland
18th-century Ministers of the Church of Scotland
Alumni of the University of Edinburgh
1730 births
1796 deaths
People from Aberdour